High Priest is the third solo album by American pop rock musician Alex Chilton, released in 1987. It was his first full-length album since 1979's commercially disastrous Like Flies on Sherbert. Chilton fronts a solid band of Memphis/New Orleans studio musicians. The album includes a cover of the 1957 instrumental "Raunchy", which was co-written by Sid Manker, who had taught Chilton guitar in his childhood at his father's expense. To promote High Priest, Chilton played more than 60 concerts between 13 September and 19 December 1987, including numerous shows with Ben Vaughn as the support act. The front cover photograph was taken in Rock River, Wyoming by Anna Lee Van Cleef.

Track listing

Side 1
"Take It Off" (Eve Darby) – 2:56
"Let Me Get Close To You" (Carole King, Gerry Goffin) – 2:39
"Dalai Lama" (Alex Chilton) – 5:15
"Volaré" (Domenico Modugno, Franco Migliacci) – 3:00
"Thing for You" (Alex Chilton, Rick Davies) – 3:16
"Forbidden Love" (Alex Chilton) – 2:44

Side 2
"Make a Little Love" (Jimmy Holiday, Mike Akopoff) – 3:30
"Trouble Don't Last" (Eddie "Guitar Slim" Jones) – 3:17
"Don't Be a Drag" (Alex Chilton) – 3:29
"Nobody's Fool" (Buddy Emmons, Dan Penn) – 3:12
"Come By Here" (Alvis Armstrong) – 3:41
"Raunchy" (Bill Justis, Sid Manker) – 2:14

CD bonus tracks
"Junkyard" (Alex Chilton) – 3:51
"Lonely Weekends" (Charlie Rich) – 3:14
"Margie" (Con Conrad, J. Russel Robinson) – 2:19
"Rubber Room" (Porter Wagoner) – 5:20

Personnel
Alex Chilton - vocals, guitar, piano
Ron Easley, George Reinecke - guitar
René Coman, Sam Sharpe - bass
Doug Garrison - drums
Jim Spake - tenor saxophone
Fred Ford - baritone saxophone
Nokie Taylor - trumpet
Jim Dickinson - piano on "Trouble Don't Last"
Lorette Velvette, René Coman, Wayne Jackson - voices
Technical
Mark Culp, Tom Laune - engineers

References

Alex Chilton albums
1987 albums